The 2016 Harrogate Borough Council election took place on 5 May 2016 to elect members of Harrogate Borough Council in England. This was on the same day as other local elections.

Ward results

Bishop Monkton

784

Boroughbridge

819

Claro

1063

Killinghall

812

Kirkby Malzeard

917

Lower Nidderdale

797

Marston Moor

Mashamshire

Newby

845

Nidd Valley

844

Ouseburn

938

Pateley Bridge

Ribston

876

Spofforth with Lower Wharfedale

835

Washburn

1015

Wathvale

697

References

2016 English local elections
2016
2010s in North Yorkshire